The 1939  San Francisco Dons football team was an American football team that represented the University of San Francisco as an independent during the 1941 college football season. In their third season under head coach George Malley, the Dons compiled a 4–3–3 record and outscored their opponents by a combined total of 92 to 91.

Schedule

References

San Francisco
San Francisco Dons football seasons
San Francisco Dons football